Hotaru no Hikari is an 1877 Japanese song based on the music of Auld Lang Syne with lyrics by Chikai Inagaki.

Hotaru no Hikari may also refer to:
 Hotaru no Hikari (manga) by Satoru Hiura
 Hotaru no Hikari (Ikimono-gakari song), a 2009 song by Ikimono-gakari